Nete may mean:
Nete (river), in northern Belgium
Grote Nete
Kleine Nete
Nete language, spoken in Papua New Guinea
Nete (mythology), one of the three muses of the lyre that were worshipped at Delphi. Her sisters were Mese and Hypate
Norethisterone enanthate (NETE), a type of birth control